SensorUp Inc. is an Internet of Things company based in Calgary, Alberta, Canada. SensorUp led the development of the Open Geospatial Consortium SensorThings API standard specification, an open and unified geospatial framework to interconnect IoT sensing devices, data, and applications over the Web. In 2014, SensorUp received funding supports from Natural Resources Canada's GeoConnections and TecTerra. In 2016, as part of the OGC Internet of Things pilot project SensorUp demonstrated its interoperable OGC SensorThings API platform solution at the Department of Homeland Security. Dr. Reginald Brothers, the Undersecretary of the Homeland Security Science and Technology, was "impressed with the ‘state of the practical’ where these various industry sensors can be integrated today using open standards that remove the stovepipe limitations of one-off technologies. " In March 2016 SensorUp submitted a new open source software project proposal, titled Whiskers, to the Eclipse Foundation. Whiskers will be an open source Javascript client library for the OGC SensorThings API and a light-weight OGC SensorThings API server for IoT gateways (e.g., Raspberry Pi).

In June 2016, SensorUp joined the ESRI Startup Program, a three-year program that gives us the tools to build mapping and location analytics capabilities into Esri products.

In September 2016, SensorUp partnered with Libelium to cloud-enable Libelium sensor networks with international OGC and ISO standards for the IoT.

In November 2016, SensorUp joined the TELUS T-squared Accelerator.

In January 2017, with the support of Natural Resources Canada, SensorUp launched the Smart City Starter Kit. The starter kit allows a city or community to set up a large-scale IoT-based smart city solution in one afternoon.

In July 2017, SensorUp launched the CloudUAV platform, empowering UAV researchers and users to manage their UAV workflow with an online portal and a smartphone application, based on the OGC SensorThings API.

In May 2018, SensorUp won the NATO Defence Innovation Challenge Award for secured federation of IoT devices.

In June 2018, SensorUp announced that it had raised $2 million in seed financing, led by Vanedge Capital, to create new data-driven IoT business solutions for Smart Cities, First Responders, and Oil and Gas Field Services.

In June 2018, SensorUp was selected to present at the Creative Destruction Lab's 2018 super session plenary session.

In September 2018, SensorUp was selected by the Plug and Play Tech Center, joined the IoT Fall 2018 Batch, and presented at Plug and Play's Winter Summit 2018.

In December 2018, SensorUp provided the OGC SensorThings API for a Department of Homeland Security Next Generation First Responder initiative's operational experimentation in Houston, Texas. SensorUp's SensorThings facilitated sensor integration and data provisioning for situational awareness and the common operating picture.

Events 
SensorUp attends the following conferences and trade shows:

 Sensors Expo '16, San Jose, June 21~23 2016
 Industrial IoT, Big Data & M2M Summit 2016, June 21~22 2016
 GEOINT2016, Orlando, May 15~18 2016
 EclipseCon 2016, Reston, VA, March 7~10 2016

Awards 
SensorUp and its team received the following awards:

 Winner of the NATO Defence Innovation Challenges 2018 on Secured Federation of IoT Devices
 Winner of TecTerra Startup of the Year 2018

References 

Technology companies of Canada
Companies based in Calgary